William of Celje (c. 1361 – 19 August 1392), also William of Cilli, Count of Celje, was a Styrian nobleman who was married to Anna of Poland, daughter of the Polish king Casimir the Great. He was the co-ruler of the House of Celje together with his uncle Hermann I until 1385 and then with his cousin Hermann II until his death. William's only daughter, Anna of Celje, married the Polish King Vladislav II Jagello in order to strengthen his claim to the Polish throne.

Life
William was the only child of Ulrich I, Count of Celje and Adelaide of Ortenburg. The date of his birth is unknown, but was probably in the early 1360s. After his father's death in 1368, William was raised by his uncle Hermann I of Celje. Hermann ruled in his nephew's name, and upon William's coming of age, they ruled jointly. After Hermann's death in 1385, William continued to rule with his cousin, Hermann's namesake son. This was in accordance with the family tradition which avoided splitting the estates by having male members of the family rule together.

William also continued the family tradition of allegiance to the Habsburgs who had become the Celjes' liege lords in the early 1300s. It was, however, during his rule that the Counts of Celje strengthened their positions by developing family and political connections stretching far beyond their native region, thus rapidly emancipating themselves from the Habsburg tutelage.

Together with his uncle Hermann I and his cousin Hermann II, William took part in the crusade against Samogitians in 1377, as part of the entourage of Duke Albert III of Austria. Like his father and grandfather before him, he served as Landeshauptmann (governor) of the Habsburg Duchy of Carniola between 1389 and 1390. In 1387, he was enfeoffed with the castle and estate of Dravograd by the Habsburg duke Albert III, further expanding the Celje's possessions along the Drava River in southern Carinthia.

William fell ill during an expedition against the Ottomans. He died in Vienna, and was buried in the Minorite Church in Celje.

Marriage and children 

In 1373, William was betrothed to Elizabeth of Gorizia, daughter of the imperial prince Meinhard, count of Gorizia and palatine count in Carinthia. However, Elizabeth died young, and William eventually married the daughter of the late Polish king Casimir the Great.

William's father Ulrich had been a mercenary military commander in the service of the Hungarian king Louis I. When Louis inherited the Polish crown, Casimir's daughter (and Louis's cousin) Anna was betrothed to William. The marriage took place on April 6, 1380. A daughter, Anna, was born in the marriage. She would eventually marry king Vladislav II of Poland.

William died in 1392 without sons, and was succeeded by his cousin Hermann II, who became the sole ruler of the House of Celje.

Family ties with the Polish monarchs 
William's uncle and caretaker Hermann was the brother-in-law of the Hungarian king Louis of Anjou. In 1370, Louis succeeded his uncle Casimir the Great as King of Poland (Louis's mother Elizabeth was Casimir's sister). Casimir had died without sons, he did however have two daughters who survived into adulthood. One of them, Anna, was still alive at the time of her father's death. At the time of Louis's ascension to the Polish throne, Anna was only four, and thus in no position to threaten Louis's claim. In order to neutralize any possible future threat from her part (or by a husband or son of hers), Louis, who was now her caretaker, decided to betroth her to a loyal, faraway and relatively unimportant ally. The House of Celje could only benefit from marrying a princess of royal blood, but they were in no position to challenge Louis's kingship. In 1380, at the age of fourteen, Anna was married to William.

In 1383, Louis, too, died without a male heir. In Hungary, his older daughter Mary would be crowned as "king", while in Poland, his younger daughter Jadwiga became the queen regnant. In 1385, Jadwiga would marry the Lithuanian duke Jogaila who was crowned as Vladislav II of Poland. In 1399, queen Jadwiga died after giving birth to her only child who also died shortly after birth. Vladislav was thus left as the sole ruler of a foreign country, whose legitimacy was contested as he had attained kingship through marriage alone. In order to strengthen his position, Vladislav married William's  daughter Anna, the only surviving granddaughter of the last Piast king Casimir the Great.

William was thus both the son-in-law and the father-in-law of a Polish king; however, Casimir III died before his marriage to Anna of Poland, and her daughter's marriage to Vladislav II took place after his death.

References

1392 deaths
Counts of Celje
Year of birth uncertain